János Flesch (30 September 1933 – 9 December 1983) was a chess Grandmaster, chess writer and coach, born in Budapest, Hungary. He is best known for claiming a world record simultaneous blindfold exhibition when he played 52 opponents in Budapest in 1960. However, he was apparently allowed to consult scoresheets of the games and therefore his claim was disallowed.

Flesch was awarded the International Master (IM) title in 1963 and the Honorary Grandmaster (GM) title in 1980. He died in an automobile accident with his wife Ildiko Tenyei in Whitstable, England, in 1983.

Represented Hungary on the Tel-Aviv Chess Olympiad (1964) (fourth place), also participated in the European Team Chess Championship in Hamburg (1965) (third place).

From 1967 he was working as chess trainer:
(1967–1970) Ferencvárosi Torna Club (FTC) Chess Club
(1971–1983) PMSC Chess Club

Playing style
János Flesch was an attacking player, taking risk in his games, developing an imaginative style of play. He often sacrificed material in search for the initiative in chess. In many of his sharp games he won with a creative attack against the opponent's king.

Notable chess games
Janos Flesch vs Mikhail Tal, Miskolc 1963, Sicilian Defense: Modern Variations,(B50), ½–½ The opponent is none other than the "Magician from Riga" the great World Champion - Mikhail Tal and Janos Flesch secures a draw in a fighting game.
Janos Flesch vs Hrumo, BFX Budapest 1960, King's Gambit: Accepted.Rosentreter-Testa Gambit,(C37), 1-0 A creative short attacking game, representing the playing style of J.Flesch.
Janos Flesch vs Viktor Korchnoi, Belgrade 1964, Sicilian Defense: Old Sicilian. General,(B30), 1-0
Janos Flesch vs Svetozar Gligoric, Belgrade 1964, King's Indian Attack(A07), ½–½
Boris Spassky vs Janos Flesch, Tel-Aviv 1964, Queen's Gambit Declined: Lasker Defense. Main Line.(D57), ½–½

Writings

References

External links

1933 births
1983 deaths
Chess grandmasters
Chess coaches
Hungarian chess players
Hungarian chess writers
Sportspeople from Budapest
20th-century chess players